Sophie Scholl – The Final Days is a 2005 German historical drama film directed by Marc Rothemund and written by Fred Breinersdorfer. It is about the last days in the life of Sophie Scholl, a 21-year-old member of the anti-Nazi non-violent student resistance group the White Rose, part of the German Resistance movement. She was found guilty of high treason by the People’s Court and executed the same day, 22 February 1943.

The film was presented at the 55th Berlin International Film Festival in February 2005 and won Silver Bear awards for Best Director and Best Actress (Julia Jentsch). It was nominated for an Academy Award for Best Foreign Language Film.

Plot
In wartime Munich, Sophie Scholl joins members of the White Rose student organization, including Sophie's brother Hans, who are preparing copies of their sixth leaflet. They have mimeographed more than they can distribute through the mail. Hans proposes distributing the extras at university the next day; despite Willi arguing that the risks are unacceptable, Hans says that he will take full responsibility, and Sophie volunteers to assist. The next day, at the main building of Munich University where classes are in session, Hans and Sophie set about putting down stacks of leaflets near the doors of lecture rooms. With only minutes left until the period ends, Sophie runs to the top floor, where she impulsively pushes a stack of leaflets over the edge of the balustrade. A janitor who saw Sophie scatter the leaflets detains the pair until the Gestapo arrive to arrest them.

The siblings are taken to the Munich Stadelheim Prison, where Sophie is interrogated by Gestapo investigator Robert Mohr. Claiming initially to be apolitical, she presents an alibi: she and her brother had nothing to do with the fliers. She noticed them in the hall and pushed a stack off the railing as a prank, and she had an empty suitcase because she was going to visit her parents in Ulm and planned to bring back some clothes. She is dismissed, but as her release form is about to be approved, the order comes not to let her go, as the Gestapo has found incontrovertible evidence that Sophie and Hans were indeed responsible for the distribution of anti-Nazi leaflets. She is placed in a prison cell with fellow dissident Else Gebel, a Communist sympathiser.

Sophie concedes her part, controverting her brother's claim he acted alone. However, determined to protect the others, she steadfastly maintains that the production and distribution of thousands of copies of leaflets in cities throughout the region were entirely the work of the siblings. Mohr, having learned that her father was an imprisoned as a dissident, admonishes her to support the laws that preserve order in a society that has funded her welfare and education. Scholl counters that before 1933 the laws protected freedom of speech and denounces atrocities committed by the Nazis, including against the mentally deficient, that she saw working as a nurse for the regime. Mohr dismisses some of her accusations, such as the extermination of the Jews, as wartime propaganda and tacitly approves of others, such as the euthanasia program, remarking that "the new Europe can only be National Socialist".

Sophie and her brother, as well as a married friend with three young children, Christoph Probst, are charged with treason, troop demoralization and abetting the enemy. In the subsequent show trial, Probst is the first to be examined by President of the People's Court Roland Freisler, whose prosecutorial zeal makes the nominal prosecutor and defense attorneys superfluous. Freisler contemptuously dismisses Probst's appeals to spare his life so that his children can have a father. Hans maintains his composure in the face of Freisler's increasingly impatient questioning. Declining to answer only what he is asked, he highlights German war crimes on the Eastern Front as immoral and proclaims that the defeat of the Nazi state by the Allies have been made all but certain; all Hitler can do is prolong the war. In her own examination, Sophie dismisses the suggestion that she was led by her brother, and declares that many people agree with what she and her group have said and written, but dare not express it. Freisler pronounces the three defendants guilty and calls on each to make a brief final statement. Sophie warns that "where we stand today, you [Freisler] will stand soon." All three are routinely sentenced to death.

Sophie, having been told of the general 99 day delay between conviction and execution, learns that she is to be executed the same day. She breaks down briefly, but regains composure and authors a final statement and receives the blessing of the prison chaplain, who subtly offers his moral support for her silence in face of interrogation. After a visit by her parents, who also express approval of what she has done, Mohr arrives and sadly watches Sophie taken away to death row. Soon after, she is led into a cell where Christoph and Hans await, and they share a final cigarette. Probst remarks, sincerely, that their actions were not in vain. As Sophie is led into a courtyard by the executioners, she remarks, "The sun is still shining". Grace is refused, and she is the first to be beheaded in the guillotine, the blade falling as the picture goes black and Hans' and Christoph's executions follow. Hans exclaims, "Es lebe die Freiheit!" ("Long live Freedom!") before the blade falls in dark, and then again a third time in silence. A caption informs of further dozens of affiliates of the White Rose executed in the following months, and others suffered harsh imprisonment.

In the closing shot, thousands of leaflets fall from the sky over Munich. A title explains that copies of the White Rose manifesto were smuggled to the Allies, who printed millions of copies of the "Manifesto of the Students of Munich" that were subsequently dropped over German cities.

Cast
 Julia Jentsch  as Sophia Magdalena 'Sophie' Scholl
 Fabian Hinrichs  as Hans Fritz Scholl
 Alexander Held  as Robert Mohr
 Johanna Gastdorf   as Else Gebel
 André Hennicke  as Dr. Roland Freisler
 Florian Stetter   as Christoph Hermann Probst
 Maximilian Brückner  as Willi Graf
    as Alexander Schmorell
 Lilli Jung  as Gisela Schertling
    as Magdalena Scholl
 Jörg Hube  as Robert Scholl
 Franz Staber  as Werner Scholl

Reception

Critical response
Sophie Scholl – The Final Days has an approval rating of 87% on review aggregator website Rotten Tomatoes, based on 95 reviews, and an average rating of 7.27/10. The website's critical consensus states: "A film that begs the audience to reflect upon their own courage and strength of character in light of this young heroine's daring story". Metacritic assigned the film a weighted average score of 76 out of 100, based on 30 critics, indicating "generally favorable reviews".

Awards and recognition
 55th Berlin International Film Festival, 2005
 Nominated for Golden Bear
 Silver Bear: Best Director – Marc Rothemund
 Silver Bear: Best Actress – Julia Jentsch
 European Film Awards, 2005
 Best European Actress – Julia Jentsch
 Audience Award
 Bernhard-Wicki-Filmpreis, 2005
 German Film Awards (Lolas)
 Audience Award
 Best Film, Silver Prize
 Best acting performance (female main role) – Julia Jentsch
 '78th Academy Awards, 2006
 Nominated for Best Foreign Language Film

See also
 Die Weiße Rose (film) (1982)
 The Nasty Girl (1990)
 Jud Newborn

References

External links
 Sophie Scholl – The Final Days film website (in English)
 Sophie Scholl – Die letzten Tage film website (in German)
 
 
 
 
 
 Sophie Scholl - The Final Days'' at YouTube

2005 films
2005 biographical drama films
German biographical drama films
Films about capital punishment
Films about the German Resistance
Films about Nazi Germany
Films set in 1943
Films set in Germany
Films set in Munich
2000s German-language films
White Rose
World War II films based on actual events
European Film Awards winners (films)
Films scored by Reinhold Heil
Films scored by Johnny Klimek
Cultural depictions of Hans and Sophie Scholl
2005 drama films
2000s German films